Jefferson Township is one of the sixteen townships of Scioto County, Ohio, United States.  The 2010 census counted 2,797 people in the township.

Geography
Located in the northern part of the county, it borders the following townships:
Union Township, Pike County - north
Madison Township - east
Harrison Township - southeast
Clay Township - south
Valley Township - west
Scioto Township, Pike County - northwest corner

No municipalities are located in Jefferson Township, although the unincorporated community of Clarktown lies in the township's southeast.

Name and history
Named after Thomas Jefferson, it is one of twenty-four Jefferson Townships statewide.

Jefferson Township was established prior to 1810.

In 1833, Jefferson Township contained two water power gristmills, one saw mill, and one horse mill and distillery, one tavern and one tan yard.

Government
The township is governed by a three-member board of trustees, who are elected in November of odd-numbered years to a four-year term beginning on the following January 1. Two are elected in the year after the presidential election and one is elected in the year before it. There is also an elected township fiscal officer, who serves a four-year term beginning on April 1 of the year after the election, which is held in November of the year before the presidential election. Vacancies in the fiscal officership or on the board of trustees are filled by the remaining trustees.

Ohio Department of Corrections Southern Ohio Correctional Facility is partly in the township.

References

External links
County website

Townships in Scioto County, Ohio
Townships in Ohio